Cycas lacrimans is a species of cycad endemic to Mindanao, Philippines.

Range
Cycas lacrimans has been recorded in the following locations within Davao Oriental Province, Mindanao.
Mati, Davao Oriental
San Isidro, Davao Oriental
Mount Galintan
Mount Hamiguitan

References

lacrimans